The Cal State Los Angeles Diablos college football team represented California State University, Los Angeles from 1951 to 1977. The Diablos competed in the National Collegiate Athletic Association (NCAA) College Division

The program had seven different head coaches in its 27 seasons of existence, including one who had multiple tenures as coach.

Coaches

References

Cal State Los Angeles Diablos

Cal State Los Angeles Diablos football